Pedro Montengón (1745–1824) was a Spanish writer.

Works

Verse
Tota Aristotelaeorum schola quatuor sermons ad Luc. Sextilium, Marseille, 1770.
Odes, (1778).

Narrative prose
Eusebio (1786–1788), second edition (revised) 1807–1808.
Antenor (1788)
The Rodrigo (1793)
Eudoxia, daughter of Belisario (1793)
The Mirtilo or pastoralists (1795)

Miscellaneous
Erudite and curious trifles for public instruction

Epic
The Conquest of Mexico (1820).

Theatre
Matilde
The impostor
The idle
The greedy lover

Translations
Agamemnon of Sophocles.
Aegisthus and Clytemnestra of Sophocles.
Emon Oedipus by Sophocles.
Antigone, by Sophocles.
Fingal of Ossian (James Macpherson)
Temora, of Ossian (James MacPherson)

People from Alicante
Writers from the Valencian Community
1745 births
1824 deaths